Weather at Pinetop is a 1964 Australian television short which aired on ABC. Produced in Adelaide it aired in Melbourne on 20 May 1964. It was written by Colin Free and was a half-hour drama, directed by Anthony Roberts. Two sets were used: a cafe interior and a cottage verandah.

Channel Nine had made The Valley of Water in Adelaide.

Plot
Birdie, the wife of a country roadside café owner, wants to leave the cafe and start a new life with Cal.

Cast
Carmel Millhouse (Birdie)
Les Dayman (Cal)
Rod Douglas (Ollie)
Myra Noblett (Gran)
Pamela Western (Noelle)

References

External links
Weather at Pinetop

1964 television films
1964 films
Australian television films
Australian Broadcasting Corporation original programming
English-language television shows
Black-and-white Australian television shows
1960s Australian television plays